Agua Fresca may refer to:

 Aguas frescas, a type of soft drink
 Agua Dulce people, former tribe in Florida
 Amor d'água fresca, Portuguese entry in 1992 Eurovision song contest